Çarpanak Island or Ktuts or Ktouts ( Ktuts kghzi), is a small island in Lake Van. It is now uninhabited, but formerly contained an Armenian monastery called Ktuts. The ruins of it can still be seen.

External links 
 Ktuts' Anapat (pictures and information at Rensselaer Digital Collections)
 Armenian Monastery on Ktuts (Charpanak) Island, Lake Van
 Armenian Monastery on Ktuts (Charpanak) Island, Lake Van

Gallery

See also 
Lake Van
Ktuts monastery
Akdamar Island
Kuş Island

Islands of Lake Van
Islands of Van Province
Islands of Turkey